Sanhan and Bani Bahlul District is a district of the Sana'a Governorate, Yemen. Its seat is Sanhan. As of 2003, the district had a population of 400,399 inhabitants. The former President of Yemen Ali Abdullah Saleh comes from Beit al-Ahmar, which lies in Sanhan District.

References

Districts of Sanaa Governorate
Sanhan and Bani Bahlul District